Administrative Procedure Act may refer to:

 Administrative Procedure Act (Japan)
 Administrative Procedure Act (United States)